Gaius Aquillius Florus was a consul of the Roman Republic in the year 259 BC. His colleague was Lucius Cornelius Scipio.

During the First Punic War, Aquillius Florus was proconsul of Sicily for the year 258 and monitored the movements of the Carthaginian general Hamilcar.

References

3rd-century BC Roman consuls
Florus, Gaius